Stackhousia muricata is a species of plant in the family Celastraceae.

It blooms between July and November producing yellow-green-brown flowers.

The species is found from the Pilbara through the Mid West and Goldfields-Esperance into the northern Great Southern region of Western Australia.

References

muricata
Plants described in 1836